is a Japanese anime series by Nippon Animation, as the 2008 installment of the famed World Masterpiece Theater series. It is an adaptation of Paul-Jacques Bonzon's novel, Les Orphelins de Simitra (The Orphans of Simitra).

It premiered across Japan from 6 January 2008 on Fuji TV's BS Fuji broadcast satellite network, and also aired in Japan on Animax. It spanned 52 episodes.

Plot
Focuses on a Greek boy named Porphyras Patagos (more fondly known as Porphy) and his sister Mina, who have been orphaned after a devastating earthquake which destroyed their home in Greece. The two decide to travel through Europe in search of a new home rather than being put in a foster home and split apart, but things turn bad when they are separated. Now Porphy must travel across Europe to find his little sister.

Characters
Porphyras "Porphy" Patagos: One of the main characters. A 12 year old who has a love of automobiles. Porphy is among the survivors of the earthquake that ravaged his village of Simitra. Has his 13th birthday in episode 18. He and Mina are reunited in the finale.
Marina "Mina" Patagos: Porphy's little sister, and one of the main characters. She celebrates her 11th birthday in episode 4. Mina managed to survive the earthquake, but was injured. Grief-stricken, she ends up separated from Porphy and in the company of a fortuneteller named Isabella until an incident with Carlos causes her to bring Mina to Tiffany Aubert for a part in a movie. She and Porphy are reunited in the finale.
Zaïmis: A classmate and friend of Porphy and Mina. He's among the survivors of the earthquake. He, his mom, Dori, and baby sister, Elpida, move to Timiza where his aunt lives. He meets up with Porphy in Paris.
Tony: One of the people who survived the earthquake.
Anek Patagos: Porphy and Mina's mother, Anek was originally the daughter of a rich family. Her mother died when she was young. As confirmed by Barnes, she didn't survive the earthquake.
Bill
Louisa: One of the survivors of the earthquake that ravaged Simitra along with her son.
Thomas: Zaïmis' father. He is among those who didn't survive the earthquake.
Dori: Zaïmis' mother who becomes pregnant with her second child, a girl Zaïmis names Elpida, who is born following the earthquake.
Apollo: Porphy and Mina's pet owl. He managed to survive the earthquake that ravaged Simitra, and remains as Porphy's companion on his search for Mina. Gets shot by a hunter in episode 43 while defending Porphy.
Corina: A spoiled girl who is the daughter of the village mayor. She had an interest in Zaïmis. Corina and her family are among those who didn't survive the earthquake.
Barnes Smith: A US army man Porphy met.
Christophore Patagos: Porphy and Mina's father. He lost his parents and family when he was young. As confirmed by Barnes, he didn't survive the earthquake.
Nicholas: A man who helps with construction of a service station.
Alessia: A girl Porphy initially mistook for a boy. She's travelled with her father ever since her mother died. She has a crush on Porphy, and once kissed him on the lips while he was sleeping. Celebrates her 16th birthday
Helena: An old school friend of Anek's.
Martha Smith: Barnes' wife.
John Smith: Barnes' first born son.
Tom Smith: Barnes' second born son, and John's little brother.
Mary Smith: Barnes' daughter, and John and Tom's baby sister.
Kafes: A man who meets with Christophore about delivering a gasp pump.
Damon: A travelling bearded man who survived the earthquake that ravaged the village of Simitra.
Basil
Elena: A nun at the church in Simitra.
Elpida: Zaïmis' baby sister who was born following the earthquake.
Lucas: A man who delivers supplies to the shelter following the earthquake.
Isabella: A woman Mina meets while separated from Porphy. She has a daughter named Lili who she claims to be similar to Mina in terms of appearance who died of illness.
Carlos: Isabella's husband and assistant who constantly gambles to help get by. He dislikes the idea of having Mina being in their group.
Django: Isabella's father.
Angelopoulos: An old man who's been living on his own since the death of his wife. Porphy paints his house in order to get a boat fee to find Mina.
Marika: A young girl Porphy befriends on his search for Mina.
Leon: A teenager who takes pity on Porphy.
Mario:
Ciro:
Dora: An old woman whose husband died prior to the series, as well as a child named Antonio.
Gasparo
Daisy: An 11-year old girl who Porphy meets on a train. She lives with her grandmother, and only visits her father on vacations.
Maximilian: A guitar player Porphy meets.
Ilaria: Maximillian's girlfriend whose family makes olive oil.
Anton, Alain, and Delia: Maximilian's dogs.
Rebecca: A woman who was once Ilaria's friend, but grew to hate her due to her relationship with Maximilian. Through Porphy's efforts, Rebecca and Ilaria manage to make up their quarrel.
Dario: Daisy's father who works in leather.
Michael: A boy from Sicily.
Andre Macini: A Sicilian who despites Americans.
Monica Mancini: Andre's little sister.
Jack Barbazza: One of Michael's big brothers, a former air force pilot involved in the Korean War. He is Monica's love interest.
Edward: One of Michael's big brother.
Bobby: A member of Jack's mob in Sicily.
Loco: A member of Andre's mob.
Don Cici
Father Alvari: A man of the church on Sicily.
Don Macini: Father of Andre and Monica.
Don Barbazza
Bruno: A hotel owner in Rome.
Heinz von Eisenfeld: A sickly German boy Mina meets in her travels with Isabella.
Count Carl von Eisenfeld: Heinz's rich father who tries to adopt Mina so Heinz will be happy.
Guido:
Antonio:
Marta: Antonio's wife.
Sofia: Antonio and Marta's daughter. She has a doll she named Bianca, and helps care for her ailing grandmother, Angela.
Mario: A man who offers Porphy an orange.
Lorenzo
Paolo
Father Juliani: A wandering priest Porphy meets.
Marissa: A woman who wears a mask to hide her disfigured face and made it seem like she lived with someone named Sandra. She gets mocked by kids due to the fact that she wears a mask. Porphy encourages her to remove her mask, and that she's beautiful regardless of her face.
Bernard: An old St. Bernard that Porphy befriends. He makes a cross for the dog when he passes away.
Emilia:
Gina
Michel
Samuel: A man with a scar on his right cheek.
Cécile: Samuel's daughter.
Maurice: Samuel's first born son, and Cécile's little brother.
Lune: Samuel's second born son, and Cécile's youngest brother.
Tiffany Aubert: An actress in movies "The Moonlight Waltz" and "The Song of the Angel". She starts caring for Mina as a favor for Isabella.
Matilde
Claude
Marianne: A woman whose daughter was taken by Germans during World War II.
Cristal: Marianne's daughter.
Giselle: A girl Porphy briefly mistook for Mina.
Xaropoulos: A man who works a Greek cuisine place in Paris.
Alex: A chef working with Xaropoulos.
Rose: A young woman who knew Tiffany Aubert.
Noel: Rose's cat.
Pascal: Tiffany Aubert's manager.
Natalie: Tiffany's maid.
Emilie: A make-up artist who helps with the filming of "The Song of the Angel".

Anime
The opening theme is  sung by Ikuko. The ending theme is  sung by Da Capo. An insert song used in episode 39 is  sung by Ikuko.

References

External links
 

World Masterpiece Theater series
Fictional Greek people
Adventure anime and manga
Historical anime and manga
Television shows set in Greece
Television shows set in Paris
Television series set in the 1940s